Jewett Norris Library, also known as Grundy County Jewett Norris Library, is a historic library building located at Trenton, Grundy County, Missouri.  It was built in 1891, and is a 2 1/2-story, Romanesque Revival style red brick and limestone building.  It has a high stone base and broad stone steps leading to a porch with heavy, round stone arches.

It was listed on the National Register of Historic Places in 1984.

References

External links
Library website

Libraries on the National Register of Historic Places in Missouri
Romanesque Revival architecture in Missouri
Library buildings completed in 1891
Buildings and structures in Grundy County, Missouri
National Register of Historic Places in Grundy County, Missouri